Herbert Turner Jenkins (June 7, 1907 – July 20, 1990) was an American law enforcement official and the longest-serving police chief of Atlanta.

Early life 
Herbert Turner Jenkins was born on June 7, 1907 in Lithonia, Georgia to police officer Gordon Alexander Jenkins (1886-1932) and his wife Jane "Jennie" Elliott Jenkins (1888-1978). Jenkins moved to Atlanta in 1924 to work in its first automotive dealership.

Career 
He joined the Atlanta Police Department in 1932 and was made chief in 1947. He served as chief for 25 years until retiring in 1972 shepherding the city through racial strife during the desegregation of public transportation, public schools and parks.
Fully backed by Mayor William Hartsfield, he was able to bring all parties to the table helping Atlanta progress mostly peacefully through straits that crippled other Southern cities.

After retiring, he became a researcher at Emory University and authored books about Atlanta history.

Personal life and death 
His wife, Marguerite "Margie" Mason Jenkins, died in 1987, and Jenkins died by suicide three years later. He was buried next to his wife at the Rockbridge Baptist Church cemetery in Norcross, Georgia, and survived by two sons.

See also 
 List of Police Chiefs of Atlanta

Bibliography 
 Keeping the Peace
Forty Years on the Force (1932–1972)
Atlanta and the Automobile (1977)

References 

Atlanta in the Age of Pericles by James Sage Jenkins (1996)
Findagrave: Herbert Jenkins

External links
 Herbert T. Jenkins Photograph Collection from the Atlanta History Center

1907 births
1990 suicides
Chiefs of the Atlanta Police Department
Suicides by firearm in Georgia (U.S. state)